Contra is the second studio album by the American indie pop band Vampire Weekend, produced by band member Rostam Batmanglij and released in January 2010 on XL Recordings.

The album received critical praise and debuted at number one on the US Billboard 200. It was recognized as one of The 100 Best Albums of the Decade So Far by Pitchfork in August 2014.

Release
The release of Contra was announced on September 15, 2009, and was released in the UK on January 11, 2010. It was released in the US on the next day. "Horchata" was released as a free download on October 5, 2009 on the band's website. The first single was "Cousins", accompanied by a 7" single, and a music video. The album was available for streaming on the band's MySpace starting on January 3, 2010. It was also available for streaming from their official website, as of January 5, 2010.

Music
In addition to their established blend of African music influences with indie rock, the album draws from genres such as ska, dancehall, and dance music. It also incorporates the electro-pop and AutoTune found on Batmanglij's Discovery side-project. The Montreal Gazette stated that the album and its predecessor established the band's hybrid worldbeat-pop style. The album has been characterized as pop, "eclectic, intellectual indie rock," and "diffident haute bourgeoisie synth pop." The band made an effort to make their second album a natural expansion on the universe created in their debut album; as a result, Contra covers a far greater gamut of musical influences than their debut album, drawing inspiration from genres such as ska on "Holiday", synth-pop on "Giving Up the Gun", speed rap on "California English" and even rave music on "Run". The production of the album, directed by Rostam Batmanglij, was also different from their former work in that it did not use chamber echo and natural reverb but instead used digital effects to give the album an eighties aesthetic. Other distinguishing features of Contra are the use of backing vocals as textural elements, the debut of Rostam as a lead guitarist and more layered drumwork in which fundamental Latin beats are blended with drum machines to create a busier rhythm section.

Title and lyrics
The album title is intended as a thematic allegory and reference, not to the Nicaraguan counter-revolutionaries, but to the 1987 video game Contra. The title Contra is a Romance language (Latin-based) word meaning "against" or "opposite", and is sometimes given as a one-word interjection, used to indicate objection or opposition to an idea or explanation. Ezra Koenig has stated in multiple interviews that the album contains lyrical themes of opposition consistent with its title, and feels it is important to understand that the word "Contra" is a fundamental concept of conflict, without any implication that one side is right or wrong. The lyrics of Contra are also meant to express a desire to be compassionate even towards people and things one disagrees with. He also states the lyrics of Contra deal with reconciling feeling of privilege and guilt, for which he uses the term "first-world guilt". Contra is considered by critics to be instrumental in cementing the cultural significance of Vampire Weekend first formed with their debut record, as Contra deepens and commits to a general attitude of rejecting traditional notions that rock musicians are poor, underprivileged rebels. Whereas their first album brought to light the prejudices against affluence and wealth in rock music, Contra, even in its title, openly argues this stigma.

The lyrics of "I Think Ur a Contra" include the phrase "Complete Control", the title of a Clash single (notably, an influential 1980 triple album by The Clash was entitled Sandinista! after the socialist militancy opposed by the Contras during the Nicaraguan Contra war). This refers partially to the controversy surrounding their punk roots. The title "Diplomat's Son" is a reference to a story singer Koenig wrote while in college about boarding school, though the content lyrically talks about a relationship told by Rostam Batmanglij. The song also features a vocal sample from M.I.A.'s "Hussel". "Holiday" begins with the opening lyrics of Fairport Convention's 1969 rendition of "Matty Groves".

Artwork and lawsuit
The cover of Contra features a candid Polaroid of a girl from 1983. The photo was found by Rostam while searching "New York City 1983" on Flickr. Lead singer Koenig states that when he first saw the image, he felt he read "some sort of hesitation" in her face, and that the band discussed at length what her possible age or emotional state could be in the photograph, without ever becoming certain of either. Koenig believed that "wrapped up in her expression is this question: 'How is she feeling?'" and that "maybe she wasn't even really sure at the time."

In an interview, Koenig revealed that the girl pictured on the front cover is "now living in Malibu". Koenig has confirmed that the picture was taken in 1983 by photographer Tod Brody and was chosen as a juxtaposition to the debut album's cover which, while taken in 2006, looks as if it "inhabits the same world". Koenig also referred to the girl as "Kirsten" in a post on Twitter. Koenig likens the image to the Rorschach test as multiple meanings can be extrapolated from just a few signifiers, saying, "Some people get very mad when they see a white blonde girl in a Polo shirt."

On July 15, 2010, Vampire Weekend, along with XL Recordings and Brody, were sued by Ann Kirsten Kennis, the woman who identified herself as the woman on the cover, for $2 million for using the photo without her permission. Kennis has said that the photo was taken while she was "a high-fashion model under contract with prestigious agencies in New York City." In addition, Kennis said that the release forms for the photo that was allegedly signed by Kennis herself, were forged. In a statement released by Kennis' lawyer Alan Neigher, Neigher said that Kennis discovered herself on the cover when her daughter brought home a copy of Contra and showed it to Kennis. Neigher also mentioned that Brody did not take the photo and said that it was taken by Kennis' mother. Despite this claim, Brody claims that he took the photo and says that he had the photo for 26 years until Vampire Weekend discovered it on his Flickr page and bought it for five thousand dollars. Kennis' own former agent, Sue Charney, told Vanity Fair, "To me it is very clearly a Polaroid taken at a casting session." Koenig later responded on the matter and said that "this is the first time any of us have ever been sued, so we're still learning how it works." He added, "There's nothing we can say about it. We're not trying to be mysterious. I imagine in the next few months there'll be plenty to talk about. Given it's our first time, we just want to do it properly."

In December 2010, Vampire Weekend filed their own lawsuit against Brody, which argued that he would be liable for any damages Kennis would receive, due to misrepresentation.

On August 15, 2011, it was announced that Kennis had dropped her lawsuit against XL Recordings and Vampire Weekend after they paid Kennis an undisclosed sum. However, the separate lawsuits against Brody from Kennis and Vampire Weekend were not dropped.

In popular culture
The song "Cousins" was used in various media, such as Peter Rabbit, Tony Hawk: Shred, Pro Evolution Soccer 2011, and The Kids are All Right.

Critical reception

Contra received acclaim from music critics. Metacritic, which assigns a normalized rating out of 100 to reviews from mainstream critics, reported an average score of 81 based on 39 reviews, described as "universal acclaim". Dave Simpson of The Guardian stated that Contra "will probably be among this year's most played and most joyful tunes." Spins Jon Dolan wrote that "the balance of classical, rock, and world instrumentation, cagey rhythms, and stunning prettiness isn't just architecturally resplendent, it's reassuringly sweet and strangely moving." Paul Stokes of NME described Vampire Weekend as "one of the most unique bands on the planet." The A.V. Club called it "a career statement, one that’s letting the world know that these Columbia University preps have more than just a fleeting interest in world music," and added that the band "continues to be Talking Heads’ heir apparent, with a good amount of Smiths-like literate pop thrown in."

On December 1, 2010, it was announced that Contra was nominated for a Grammy for "Best Alternative Music Album". Contra was ranked number 6 on Rolling Stone list of the 30 Best Albums of 2010. Pitchfork placed it at number 6 on its list "The Top 50 Albums of 2010". Consequence of Sound named it the best album of 2010.

Commercial performance
It is the band's first album to reach number one on the Billboard 200, and the 12th independently-distributed album in history to reach the number one spot on the Billboard 200 since Nielsen Soundscan began recording data in 1991, while also being the first independent artist to have done so without ever having signed with a major label, after already established rock bands Radiohead and Pearl Jam and before Arcade Fire's The Suburbs. The album sold 124,000 copies in its first week and was awarded Gold by the RIAA on November 21, 2011 which means it has sold over 500,000 units in the US alone. In 2010. It was awarded a diamond certification from the Independent Music Companies Association which indicated sales of at least 250,000 copies throughout Europe.

Track listing

Personnel
Vampire Weekend
Ezra Koenig – lead vocals; guitar (tracks 3, 4, 6, 7); keyboard (track 1); piano (track 10); programming (track 8)
Rostam Batmanglij – piano; background vocals; vocal harmonies; keyboards; harpsichord; VSS-30; drum; synth; sampler programming; lead vocals (bridge of track 9); guitar (tracks 2–5, 7–10); shakers, hand drum, snares (track 9)
Christopher Tomson – drums
Chris Baio – bass; background vocals (tracks 2, 4); additional synth (track 4)

Additional musicians
Mauro Refosco – marimbas, rebolo, zabumba, shekere, shakers, auxiliary percussion (track 1)
Marcus Farrar – shekere, auxiliary percussion (track 1)
Libby Gery – vocals (track 8)
Anne Donlon – vocals (tracks 1, 8)
Nat Baldwin – double bass (tracks 1, 5, 8)
Jonathan Chu – violin, viola (tracks 1, 4, 5, 9)
Hamilton Berry – cello (tracks 1, 4, 5, 8–10)
Seth Rosenfeld – cello (track 8)
Jesse Novak – additional instrumentation (track 8)
Jeff Curtin – hand drums (tracks 8, 10); shakers (track 10)
Shane Stoneback – shaker (track 10)

Production
Rostam Batmanglij – production; string arrangements; mixing; engineering
Justin Gerrish – mixing (tracks 1, 3–10); engineering (tracks 1–6, 8–10)
Shane Stoneback – mixing assistance ; engineering (tracks 1–6, 8–10)
Fernando Lodeiro – engineering assistance (tracks 1–6, 8–10)
Tito Fuentes – engineering (track 7)
Melchor M – engineering assistance (track 7)
Emily Lazar – mastering
Joe LaPorta – assistant mastering engineering

Release
Tod Brody – cover photograph
Chris Tomson – band photograph
Rostam Batmanglij – design
Asher Sarlin – design

Charts

Weekly charts

Year-end charts

Certifications

See also

List of number-one independent albums (U.S)

References

External links
 VW's Track-by-Track
 Stream of the album at NPR

2010 albums
Vampire Weekend albums
XL Recordings albums
Albums produced by Rostam Batmanglij
Synth-pop albums by American artists